Mamraz Koti (also Romanized as Mamraz Kotī) is a village in Dabuy-ye Jonubi Rural District, Dabudasht District, Amol County, Mazandaran Province, Iran. At the 2006 census, its population was 265, in 69 families.

References 

Populated places in Amol County